The Franklin Mineral Museum in Franklin, New Jersey is a mineral, geology, and mining museum at the former Franklin Mine.  It is located in Sussex County, New Jersey.

History
The mine was active from 1898 until the mid-1950s.

The mine site became an open-air museum in 1964.

Features
The Franklin Mineral Museum has a large mineral collection, a simulated mine tunnel, and Native American artifacts.  Visitors are allowed to collect mineral specimens in several areas of the former mine's tailings.

Local minerals room – here you can find collections with more than 5,000 mineral specimens on display. It is one of the biggest and most diverse collections of minerals in the world. It includes important ore minerals, pegmatite, volcanic rocks, and others.

Fluorescent minerals room – here you can explore the surreal display of fluorescent minerals. The main display is 32 feet long and it is unsurpassed in the world for the variety of its colors.

Indian room – there are numerous Native American artifacts, including the collection of stone tools made by the Lenni Lenape Indians, the earliest inhabitants of what later became New Jersey. The collection contains artifacts from all over the United States and Mexico, and includes tools such as axes, spear heads, knives, as well as some pottery and baskets.

Fossil room – contains a wide variety of fossils from dinosaurs and different animals.

Life-size mine replica – it contains underground mine passages where people can explore the mines, experience and see first-hand the mining methods that were used.

References

External links

Mindat.org: entry for Franklin Mineral Museum

Museums in Sussex County, New Jersey
Mineralogy museums
Mining museums in New Jersey
Geology museums in New Jersey
Industry museums in New Jersey
Mines in New Jersey
Underground mines in the United States
Franklin, New Jersey
Museums established in 1964
1964 establishments in New Jersey